Walter Scott Buchanan (1 June 1855 – 11 November 1926) was an English international footballer, who played as a forward.

Career
Born in Hornsey and educated at Cranleigh School, Buchanan played for Clapham Rovers, and earned one cap for England in 1876.

References

1855 births
1926 deaths
English footballers
England international footballers
Clapham Rovers F.C. players
Footballers from Hornsey
Association football forwards